Douglas Yeo (born 1955) is an American bass trombonist who played in the Boston Symphony Orchestra from 1985 to 2012, where he held the John Moors Cabot Bass Trombone Chair. He was also on the faculty of the New England Conservatory.  In 2012 he retired from the BSO and accepted a position as professor of trombone at the Arizona State University School of Music, a position he held until 2016. In 2019, he was appointed to the faculty of Wheaton College (Illinois).

Background 
Born in Monterey, California in 1955, Yeo holds a bachelor of music degree with honors from Wheaton College in Illinois and a master of arts degree from New York University. His principal teachers were Edward Kleinhammer and Keith Brown.

Before joining the Boston Symphony Orchestra/Boston Pops Orchestra in May 1985, Yeo was a member of the Baltimore Symphony Orchestra, (1981–1985), and was on the faculties of the Peabody Conservatory of Music, in Baltimore, and The Catholic University of America in Washington, D.C.. His background has included a four-year tenure with the Goldman Band, and performances with the Vienna Philharmonic Orchestra, the Mostly Mozart Festival Orchestra, the Gerry Mulligan Big Band, and orchestras for numerous Broadway shows.

From 1998 to 2008, he was Music Director of the New England Brass Band, which released five compact disc recordings under his direction. In 2006, the New England Brass Band, under Mr. Yeo's direction, won first place in the Honors Section at the North American Brass Band Association National Championship, held in Louisville, Kentucky.

He announced his retirement from the BSO, effective on August 27, 2012, at the conclusion of the Tanglewood 75th anniversary season. He moved to Arizona, where he was appointed Professor of Trombone at Arizona State University (Tempe).

In 2014, he was the recipient of the International Trombone Association's highest honor, the ITA Award, presented to him "in recognition of his distinguished career and in acknowledgement of his impact on the world of trombone performance."

Performance and recording highlights 
He has been a soloist with the Boston and Baltimore Symphony Orchestras; on both occasions becoming the first bass trombonist to perform as soloist with either orchestra.
In 1991, he gave the premiere of Vaclav Nelhybel's Concerto for Bass Trombone with the New England Conservatory Wind Ensemble.
He performed John Williams' Tuba Concerto with the Boston Pops Orchestra under Mr. Williams, becoming the first bass trombonist to perform the piece.
He gave the first performance of Lawrence Wolfe's Wildfire with the University of Washington Wind Ensemble in 1995.
He has premiered numerous compositions by Norman Bolter including Temptation for serpent and string quartet, Ancestors for digeridoo, shofar and serpent, and La Grotte Cosquer for tenor and bass trombones.
His first solo recording, Proclamation, with The Black Dyke Mills Band, featured premieres of four newly commissioned works: Proclamation by Gordon Langford, Rainy Day in Rio by Goff Richards, Triptych by Lawrence Wolfe, and Tribute to George Roberts, arranged by Bill Geldard.
His second solo recording, Take 1, featured live solo performances given in concert from 1975 to 1997 including Alan Hovhannes' Symphony Number 34, Opus 310 for Bass Trombone and Strings.
His solo recording, Cornerstone, of arrangements of hymns and gospel songs for bass trombone and piano, was released in 2000.
In March 2002, he recorded Two of a Mind, an album of solos and duets with British tenor trombonist Nick Hudson, accompanied by the Williams Fairey Band and pianist David Chapman.
In May 1997, he performed Simon Proctor's Concerto for Serpent and Orchestra with the Boston Pops Orchestra under the direction of John Williams.
An album released in 2003, Le Monde du Serpent, features his playing serpent in repertoire spanning over three centuries.
In 1982, 1999, 2004, 2014, 2017, and 2018 he was a featured guest artist and clinician at the International Trombone Festival.
In 1999 he also performed the Christopher Brubeck Concerto for Bass Trombone and Orchestra with the Boston Pops Orchestra.
 In 2000, his performance of the finale of the Brubeck Concerto, "James Brown in the Twilight Zone", was broadcast on television as part of the "Evening at Pops" series on the Public Broadcasting Service (PBS).

Historic brass speciality 

In addition to playing the bass trombone, Yeo plays bass trumpet, contrabass trombone, and has become a leading exponent of historical brasses such as the buccin, serpent, ophicleide and bass sackbut.

In 2001 he joined the orchestra of Boston Baroque for performances of Monteverdi's L'Orfeo (on bass sackbut) and Handel's Music for the Royal Fireworks (on serpent), the latter of which released in 2003 on the Telarc label. He joined Boston's Handel and Haydn Society for performances of Berlioz' Symphonie Fantastique (playing ophicleide) in 2002 and in the Monteverdi Vespers of 1610 (playing bass sackbut) in 2003.

In 2005 he played serpent with wind players from the Handel & Haydn Orchestra on the Divertimento in B flat [St. Antoni Chorale] attributed to Haydn and in Henry Purcell's Dido and Aeneas. Also in 2005 he played ophicleide in the first North American performance on original instruments of Berlioz's Romeo and Juliet with Chorus Pro Musia in Boston.

In June 2005 he presented a paper on serpent and ophicleide players in brass bands at the Great American Brass Band Festival's History Conference (Danville, Kentucky) and also performed a solo on ophicleide accompanied by the Athena Brass Band.

He presented a recital of music for serpent at the 2000 Historic Brass Festival at the University of Connecticut (Storrs, Connecticut), has lectured on the serpent at the Boston Museum of Fine Arts, the National Music Museum in Vermillion, South Dakota and the Metropolitan Museum of Art in New York City, and is named in the New Grove II Dictionary of Music's article on the serpent.

Other activities 
Yeo has been extensively involved in teaching. In addition to his major positions at Wheaton College, Arizona State University, and New England Conservatory, he has eight times been on the faculty of the annual Hamamatsu International Wind Instrument Academy and Festival (Hamamatsu, Japan), and has been guest artist and teacher at the International Trombone and Tuba Festival (Beijing, China), the Dutch Bass Trombone Open (Amsterdam, The Netherlands), and the Nagoya Trombone Festival (Nagoya, Japan).

A prolific writer, Yeo has written more than forty articles on the trombone and orchestral playing for various publications, including International Musician, The Instrumentalist, The Brass Herald, Christianity Today, the Historic Brass Society Journal, the International Trombone Association Journal, and the T.U.B.A. Journal.

He did extensive research in the Boston Symphony archives, resulting in the publication of four photo/historical articles on BSO brass players from 1881 to the present; he mounted an exhibit at Symphony Hall on the history and hobbies of members of the Boston Symphony from 1881 to the present during the 1993–94 season. In 2000, he wrote a trombone teaching curriculum for the University of Reading's (United Kingdom) Music Teaching in Private Practice Initiative of their Department of Arts and Humanities in Education.

He is the co-author, along with Edward Kleinhammer, of Mastering the Trombone (Ensemble Publications), and is author of The One Hundred: Essential Works for the Symphonic Bass Trombonist (Encore Music Publishers), and Serpents, Bass Horns and Ophicleides in the Bate Collection (Oxford University Press). In 2021, he published two books, Homer Rodeheaver and the Rise of the Gospel Music Industry (University of Illinois Press), co-authored with Kevin Mungons, and An Illustrated Dictionary for the Modern Trombone, Tuba, and Euphonium Player (Rowman & Littlefield).

Yeo was the plaintiff in a 1994 court case, Yeo vs. Lexington, that tested important issues in scholastic media law. In 1997 Yeo won on appeal to the First Circuit Court of Appeals but subsequently lost at the First Circuit Court of Appeals (en banc)  and carried the case to the US Supreme Court which declined to hear it.

References

External links 
 http://www.yeodoug.com
 http://www.thelasttrombone.com
 https://www.wheaton.edu/academics/faculty/douglas-yeo/

American classical trombonists
Male trombonists
Living people
New England Conservatory faculty
1955 births
Wheaton College (Illinois) alumni
Benjamin T. Rome School of Music, Drama, and Art faculty
Peabody Institute faculty
People from Monterey, California
Arizona State University faculty
20th-century classical trombonists
20th-century classical musicians
20th-century American musicians
21st-century classical trombonists
21st-century classical musicians
21st-century American musicians
Classical musicians from California
20th-century American male musicians
21st-century American male musicians